Talossa, also known as the Kingdom of Talossa, is one of the earliest micronationsfounded in 1979 by then-14-year-old Robert Ben Madison of Milwaukee and at first confined to his bedroom; he adopted the name after discovering that the word means "inside the house" in Finnish. Among the first such projects still maintained, it has kept up a web presence since 1995. Its internet and media exposure since the late 1990s contributed to the appearance of other subsequent internet micronations.

Talossa claims several places on Earth as its territory, especially a portion of Milwaukee, calling it the "Greater Talossan Area"; no such claim, however, is recognized by the United Nations or by any other nation. As of June 23, 2016, the number of active citizens is said to be 213. Including those who are no longer citizens for various reasons, those who are under the age of 14 and so are not yet citizens, and those from the ESB Affair there are 493 total registered individuals.
The current King of Talossa is John Wooley (Ian Lupul). The successors to the throne are the children of the Present King (Prince Patrick, Prince Peter, Princess Daniele).                                                                                                                   Kings of Talossa :                                                                                                                 Robert I (1979–1987),  Robert II (1987), Florence I (1987–1988), Robert I (1988–2005), Louis (Regent, 2005–2006), John I (2006–)

Culture 
Talossan culture has been developed over the years by Robert Madison and other fans. The Talossan language, also created by Madison in 1980, claims a vocabulary of 35,000 root words and 121,000 derived wordsincluding fieschada, meaning "love at first sight".

History and growth 
Talossa was founded as a kingdom on December 26, 1979, by Madison, shortly after the death of his mother. Madison maintained Talossa throughout his adolescence, publishing a handwritten newspaper and designing a flag and emblem. During this time its only other members were about a dozen relatives and acquaintances. This changed in the mid-1990s, when a series of stories in the New York Times and Wired, subsequently republished elsewhere, drew his website to popular attention. Several new "citizens" joined Talossa as a result, and Madison began to claim that he was the inventor of the term "micronation".

In April 1996, Madison reestablished the dormant League of Secessionist States—an intermicronational organisation  originally founded by him and two friends in 1980—and launched a website for it. Between 1997 and at least 2000, it was the most prominent intermicronational organisation on the Internet.

Madison disestablished the "kingdom" in late 2005, but Talossa is still active today despite the lack of involvement of the original founder.

Madison registered "Talossa" as a service mark in 2005 and created Talossa, Inc., a Wisconsin not-for-profit corporation. By 2013 the service mark had been cancelled and the corporation had been administratively dissolved.

Talossan language 

Madison invented Talossan ( or  ) as a constructed language for his micronation. With its relatively large vocabulary, which is mostly French-based, it is said to be one of the most detailed fictional languages ever invented. The former Association of Talossan Language Organisations (ATLO) maintained a website describing the language for new learners, providing language information, research and online translation to and from English. The ISO 639 designation is "tzl". That website is now deprecated, and new resources will be created with the formation of la Società per l'Ilesnaziun del Glheþ Naziunal (Society for the Facilitation of the National Language, SIGN).

The language is overseen by the Comità per l'Útzil del Glheþ ("Committee for the Use of the Language," CÚG), a group formed by Madison which periodically issued both Arestadas (decrees) to describe and document changes in language usage of the language and Pienamaintschen (supplements), to update the vocabulary list. The CÚG maintained a multi-lingual website providing access to the recent recommendations of the Committee.

More recently, la SIGN is currently being created with the goal of assuming the CÚG's responsibilities.

Writing system 
Talossan uses the Latin alphabet. The letters of modern Talossan are:

See also 
 Constructed language (conlang)
 List of micronations

Literature 
 Clemens J. Setz: Die Bienen und das Unsichtbare, Suhrkamp Verlag, Berlin 2020, pp. 174–184.

References

External links 
 Talossa website
 Talossa wiki
 Talossan language information and translation resource
 Committee for the Use of Talossan Language
 L'Översteir, bidirectional Talossan-English translator
 2010 Arestada newsletter
 

Artistic languages
Constructed languages
Micronations in France
Micronations in the United States
States and territories established in 1979
West Antarctica micronations